Chryseobacterium soldanellicola  is a Gram-negative bacteria from the genus of Chryseobacterium which has been isolated from roots of the plant Calystegia soldanella in Tae-an in Korea.

References

Further reading

External links
Type strain of Chryseobacterium soldanellicola at BacDive -  the Bacterial Diversity Metadatabase

soldanellicola
Bacteria described in 2006